Nipsan (or Southern Yali/Yale, Mek Nipsan) is a Papuan language of Nipsan District, Yahukimo Regency, Highland Papua.

References

Mek languages